Patel v. Garland, 596 U.S. ___ (2022), was a United States Supreme Court case related to the jurisdiction of federal courts over immigration appeals.

Background 

Pankajkumar Patel entered the United States illegally in February 1992. In August 2007, he applied for adjustment of status to receive a green card. In December 2008, Patel sought to renew his Georgia driver's license and checked a box on the application specifying that he was a United States citizen. An immigration judge later denied his application for adjustment of status on that basis, and the Board of Immigration Appeals (BIA) affirmed. Patel asserted that because he would be eligible for the driver's license regardless of his citizenship status, his mistake on the form should not matter when it comes to his immigration application. He subsequently petitioned the United States Court of Appeals for the Eleventh Circuit for review of the BIA's decision, but a panel of the court held it lacked jurisdiction to consider the claim. Both Patel and the government disagreed with this reading of the jurisdiction-stripping provision of the immigration code, and the court granted rehearing en banc. The Eleventh Circuit again reached the same outcome, this time in an 11–4 vote. Patel filed a petition for a writ of certiorari.

Supreme Court 

Certiorari was granted in the case on June 28, 2021. As both Patel and the government disagreed with the Eleventh Circuit's decision, the court appointed Taylor Meehan of Consovoy McCarthy to defend the judgment below. Oral arguments were held on December 6, 2021. On May 16, 2022, the Supreme Court affirmed the Eleventh Circuit in a 5–4 decision, with Justice Amy Coney Barrett writing the majority, and Justice Neil Gorsuch writing the dissent.

References

External links 
 

2022 in United States case law
United States Supreme Court cases
United States Supreme Court cases of the Roberts Court
United States immigration and naturalization case law